Abdul Rahman bin Yahya (also known as Abdur Rahman bin Yahya) was a politician from Yemen who served as Head of Government of Yemen from 1962 to 1960s and Deputy Prime Minister of Yemen.

References 

Deputy Prime Ministers of Yemen